Wembley International Kindergarten is an English medium kindergarten located in the Taikoo Shing area of Hong Kong.

The Kindergarten was established in 1984 and has been led by a native British Principal since its inception. Children are educated in a Western environment and given a solid foundation in phonetics which is known to enhance reading ability. Children graduating from Wembley International Kindergarten often progress on to International Primary Schools.

Curriculum 

English medium education system with  Key Phonetic approach. Children are exposed to practical life activities, art and craft to build teamwork, explorative music, dance and drama and story telling. Good manners, etiquette and mindfulness are encouraged. Wembley has a pat-a-pet programme introducing interaction with live animals. Outdoor activities take place to encourage self-confidence in speaking English. Interaction with the environment is encouraged to help develop responsible caring citizens of the future.

Extra-curricular

Classes

Uniform 

All students much purchase a school uniform bearing the kindergarten logo.

Summer uniform: White T-shirt and blue shorts.

Winter uniform: Blue tracksuit with a white collar.

Admission Procedure 

Wembley accepts applicants from all backgrounds and all levels of English.
Application forms are available at the school.
Required documents are 4 passport size photos, photo-copy of the child’s birth certificate and the child's health record.

Location 

The Kindergarten is located at 2/F Tang Kung Mansion, 31 Taikoo Shing Road, Taikoo Shing, Hong Kong.
Many local buses travel to Taikoo Shing with the closest bus stop located outside Cityplaza 2.
If travelling by the MTR Exit D is the closest exit.
The school is 5 mins walk past the East Hotel to Tang Kung Mansion, where the Taikoo Shing Management Office is located, a staircase on the right side of the Mansion leads to the 2/F level giving direct access to the Kindergarten.

External links
 

 

Early childhood education in Hong Kong
Schools of English as a second or foreign language